Major General Richard M. Wells (born November 28, 1929) of United States Army was Director of Defense Mapping Agency from August 1981 to June 1983.

Education
Major General Wells graduated from the U.S. Military Academy in 1951 and received an MS from Iowa State University in 1956. In 1964 he completed the Naval War College, simultaneously earning an MA in international affairs from George Washington University. He graduated from the National War College in 1969.

Career
After one year in Korea, Major General Wells taught engineering at the U.S. Naval Academy for three years, served in the Office of the Chief of Engineers, and commanded the 84th Engineer Battalion (Construction) in the Republic of Vietnam.

Beginning in September 1970, he served in Washington, DC, as chief of the Strategic Mobility and Readiness Team in the Planning and Programming Analysis Directorate of the Office of the Assistant Vice Chief of Staff, U.S. Army. He moved to Chicago in August 1971, where he served for two years as district engineer in the U.S. Army Corps of Engineers’ Chicago District.

He then became chief of the Engineer Branch of the Office of Personnel Directorate for the U.S. Army. He commanded the 4th Advanced Individual Training Brigade in Fort Leonard Wood, Missouri, prior to his appointment as division engineer of the U.S. Army Engineer Division, Middle East, in Saudi Arabia; a position he held until July 1978.

From 1978 to 1981, he served as division engineer of the U.S. Army Engineer Division, North Pacific, in Portland, Oregon.

Defense Mapping Agency
As director of the Defense Mapping Agency from 1981 to 1983, Major General Wells provided critical leadership as the agency embarked on a $2.6 billion modernization program during the transition of the national intelligence and mapping program from a film-based program to a flexible, digital-based satellite imaging system. Wells presented the technical and funding plan through the Office of the Secretary of Defense to Congress and successfully secured the plan’s approval and funding.

In July 1983, after his tour as director of DMA, Wells became deputy chief of engineers in the Army’s Office of the Chief of Engineers, in Washington, DC. He retired from the Army in 1984.

Accolades
Major General Wells was inducted into the NGA Hall of Fame in 2004. His other military decorations include the Legion of Merit with oak leaf cluster, a bronze star medal in Korea, and two Air Medals in Vietnam.

References

United States Army generals
Iowa State University alumni
Elliott School of International Affairs alumni
United States Naval Academy faculty
Naval War College alumni
National War College alumni
1929 births
Living people